Ichadi Manini (English: My Son is a Gem)  is a 2019 Indian Meitei language film directed by Geet Yumnam and produced by Ningthoujam Malakumari. It stars Amar Mayanglambam and Bala Hijam in the lead roles. The movie won the Special Jury and Best Actor in a Leading Role - Male Awards at the 13th Manipur State Film Awards 2020. The film was released at Bhagyachandra Open Air Theatre (BOAT), Palace Compound, Imphal on 28 July 2019.

Synopsis
The well going Meiraba's family is broken into fragments due to the immoral acts of his father, Thoiba. He develops illicit affairs with a married lady Sakhenbi. This leads Meiraba to sacrifice his youth life for his mother and sister. Yaiphabi, Meiraba's girlfriend, tries to help him in every possible ways. But certain unforeseen circumstances makes Meiraba distance himself from his girlfriend. The clueless Yaiphabi agrees to tie knot with a stranger guy out of frustration. When she knows the truth, she leaves everything and stands for Meiraba. They are united again. Thoiba also realises his mistakes and comes back for forgiveness and rebuilding of his shattered family.

Cast
 Amar Mayanglambam as Meiraba
 Bala Hijam as Yaiphabi
 Denny Likmabam as Thoiba, Meiraba's father
 Ningthoujam Rina as Meiraba's mother
 Thoinao as Echantombi, Meiraba's younger sister
 Prameshwori as Sakhenbi
 Idhou as Yaiphabi's father
 Ratan Lai as Telheiba, Goldsmith
 Prasanta Oinam as Lukhoi, Meiraba's friend
 Jenny Khurai as Beautician
 Linthoi Chanu as Yaiphabi's Aunty
 R.K. Hemabati as Sakhenbi's mother
 Bindiya as Sakhenbi's daughter

Accolades
Amar Mayanglambam and Ningthoujam Rina won the Best Actor in a Leading Role (Male) and Special Jury Awards respectively at the 13th Manipur State Film Awards 2020.

Ichadi Manini got two titles out of the nominated five at 9th MANIFA 2020.

Music
Surmani (Rishi) composed the soundtrack for the film and Binoranjan Oinam wrote the lyrics. The songs are titled Thammoigee Meehul and Hey Punshi. The online copyrights of the songs were procured by Mami Taibang.

References

2010s Meitei-language films
2019 films